Atal Bihari Panda (1928/9 – 5 June 2021) was an Indian actor, playwright and lyricist, known for his works in Sambalpuri odia Cinema. He was the recipient of numerous awards, including two back-to-back Odisha State Film Awards for best actor. His debut in films came at an age of 83 years. Before his debut as an actor in films, he had already written 60 plays. He also wrote lyrics in many Sambalpuri songs.

Early works
He acted in over 100 plays apart from writing over 65 dramas in the Sambalpuri language. He also worked as a playwright in  six operas. Initially director Sabyasachi Mohapatra approached him to write dialogue for the film Sala Budha. The director was looking for the protagonist for that film but he could not find one so he approached Atal to play the lead role and Panda agreed.

Career

He made his debut in  film 'Sala Budha' in lead role and the film was directed by Sabyasachi Mohapatra in 2013. He won the Best actor award for the film Sala Budha at Odisha State Film awards. In 2014, he again got the chance to work with the director Sabyasachi Mohapatra in the film "Aadim Vichar", which was a sequel to "Sala Budha".
He appeared again in the lead role in the third installment of Sala Budha film series titled “Sala Budhar Badla” released on 17 January 2020.

Filmography

Awards

Death
Atal Bihari Panda died on 5 June 2021 while undergoing treatment at Veer Surendra Sai Institute of Medical Sciences and Research. He was 92 years old .

References

External links

1920s births
Year of birth uncertain
2021 deaths
Indian male actors
Actors from Odisha
Actors in Odia cinema
People from Subarnapur district